Rajendra Bajgain is a Nepalese politician, belonging to the Nepali Congress currently serving as the member of the 2nd Federal Parliament of Nepal. In the 2022 Nepalese general election, he won the election from Gorkha 1 (constituency). Bajgain is a Nepalese entrepreneur and politician who has made significant contributions to the travel industry and politics in Nepal. He is the Managing Director of Gurkha Encounters Adventure and Luxury Services, a leading adventure tourism company that offers top-quality guides and a wide range of expeditions throughout Nepal, including the Everest region and hidden Himalayan valleys. Bajgain is known for his extensive experience in the travel industry and his ability to connect with people from all over the world.

Early life and career: 
Bajgain was born into a farming family in the hilly Gorkha district of Nepal. He showed determination from a young age and taught himself to swim after nearly drowning in the local Daraudi River. His passion for adventure and travel started when he was a child, and he has been in the industry for over 30 years. During this time, he has worked his way up to become one of the most respected figures in the industry.

Business career: 
Bajgain's company, Gurkha Encounters Adventure and Luxury Services, is known for its top-quality guides and a wide range of expeditions all over Nepal. His company conducts rigorous risk assessments, and his guides are top-tier license holders who graduate from the government-run training center in Nepal. Rajendra is passionate about promoting tourism in Nepal and has said that 45,000 British tourists come to Nepal every year, many of whom are trekkers and climbers.

Political career: 
In addition to his work in the travel industry, Bajgain is also a politician. He joined the Nepali Congress Party and has become a member of the party's working committee at large. He has also been a member of the Nepal Communist Party (NCP) and has run for the House of Representatives in the country's general elections. Bajgain is known for his dedication to promoting tourism and sustainable development in Nepal. He has been involved in organizing various events to attract foreign tourists to the country and has worked to improve the living standards of the people in his constituency.

Personal life and philanthropy: 
Rajendra Bajgain is married and has two children. He is a well-known philanthropist and has been recognized for his commitment to helping people in need. He has paid for a helicopter to rescue a villager in a remote area who required medical attention, and has been involved in various charitable activities throughout his career.

Recognition: 
Bajgain's contributions to the travel industry and politics in Nepal have earned him recognition both nationally and internationally. He has received several awards for his work, including the Everest Summiteers Association Award in 2017 for his contribution to the promotion of mountaineering in Nepal.

Overall, Rajendra Bajgain is an inspiring figure who has demonstrated a strong commitment to helping others and promoting positive change in Nepal. His diverse experiences and accomplishments in both business and politics have made him a respected and influential figure in his country.

References

Living people
Nepal MPs 2022–present
1973 births